Pétanque in the 27th Southeast Asian Games was held in Naypyidaw, Myanmar between December 12–21.

Medal summary

Men

Women

Mixed

Medal table

References

2013 Southeast Asian Games events
Southeast Asian Games
2013